Aulidiotis is a genus of moths in the family Gelechiidae.

Species
 Aulidiotis bicolor Moriuti, 1977
 Aulidiotis biloba Liu & Li, 2016
 Aulidiotis phoxopterella Snellen, 1903
 Aulidiotis recta Liu & Li, 2016
 Aulidiotis trimaculata Liu & Li, 2016

References

Gelechiinae
Moth genera